Blakesley is a surname and may refer:
 Joseph Williams Blakesley (1808–1885), English Anglican clergyman and author
 Nora David, Baroness David (née Blakesley) (1913-2009), English Labour Party politician